Khal Adath Jeshurun (KAJ) is an Orthodox German Jewish Ashkenazi congregation in the Washington Heights neighborhood, in the New York City borough of Manhattan. It has an affiliated synagogue in the heavily Orthodox Jewish neighborhood of Monsey, New York.

History

The community is a direct continuation of the pre-Second World War Jewish community of Frankfurt am Main led by Samson Raphael Hirsch. Khal Adath Jeshurun bases its approach, and structure, on Hirsch's philosophy of Torah im Derech Eretz; it was re-established according to the protocol originally drawn in 1850, to which the congregation continues to adhere.

The community is colloquially called "Breuer's" after Rabbi Joseph Breuer, founder of the American incarnation and its first Rabbi. He was a grandson of Samson Raphael Hirsch.

Nusach
Unlike most Ashkenazic synagogues in the United States, which follow the Eastern Ashkenazic (Poilisher) liturgical rite, KAJ follows the Western Ashkenazic rite, in its liturgical text, practices, and melodies. They use the Rödelheim Siddur Sfas Emes (see: Wolf Heidenheim), though the congregation's nusach varies in some places from Rödelheim.

Full service community

True to the "full-service community" as originally established in Frankfurt, the community includes a synagogue, an elementary school (located at 85 Bennett Avenue), various educational facilities, a social hall, a high school, a Beth Midrash (these are several blocks north, where Bennett Avenue meets 190th or 191st St). The Kehilla also offers its members a mikveh, Kashrut supervision and Shechitah. The yeshivas go under the name Yeshiva Rabbi Samson Raphael Hirsch. It also offers an independent Chevra kadisha. The members of the community tend to live in the buildings on Bennett Avenue, Overlook Terrace, and the adjacent cross streets towards the west and Fort Washington Avenue.

Rabbis 

 Rav Joseph Breuer: founded the American community, led it until his passing in 1980.
 Rav Shimon Schwab: In 1958, Rav Breuer recruited Rav Schwab as  Rav. Rav Schwab, became head of the community in 1980, until his death in 1995.
 Rav Zechariah Gelley: In 1987, Rav Schwab helped select Rav Gelley as the next Rav. Rav Gelley became the community's third leader in 1995, until his Petirah on April 19, 2018.
 Rav Yisroel Mantel, previously of Lucerne, Switzerland, was Rav together with Rav Gelley, and became the official Mora D'asra upon Rav Gelley's Petira.

Literature 

Stephen M. Lowenstein: Frankfurt on the Hudson, The German Jewish Community of Washington Heights, 1933-82, Its Structure and Culture, Wayne State University Press 1989.

See also
Yekke
Torah Lehranstalt

References

External links
 
 "Rabbi Joseph Breuer: The Rav of Frankfurt, U.S.A.", Ernst Bodenheimer, Jewish Observer
 On the Breuer Kehilla, Pinchas Frankel, ou.org
 Khal Adas Jeshurun, Gershon Tannenbaum, jewishpress.com

Ashkenazi synagogues
German-Jewish culture in New York City
Orthodox synagogues in New York City
Synagogues in Manhattan
Washington Heights, Manhattan
People from Monsey, New York
Yekke